The Grammy Award for Best Contemporary Folk Album was awarded from 1987 to 2011.  Until 1991 the award was known as the Grammy Award for Best Contemporary Folk Recording. In 2007, this category was renamed Best Contemporary Folk/Americana Album. As of 2010 the category was split into two categories; Best Contemporary Folk Album and Best Americana Album.

An award for Best Traditional Folk Album was also presented.  Prior to 1987 contemporary and traditional folk were combined as the Best Ethnic or Traditional Folk Recording.

Following the 2011 Grammy Award ceremony, the award was discontinued due to a major overhaul of Grammy categories. Beginning in 2012, this category merged with the Best Traditional Folk Album category to form the new Best Folk Album category.

Years reflect the year in which the Grammy Awards were presented, for works released in the previous year.

At three wins each, Bob Dylan and Steve Earle are the category's biggest winners.

Winners and nominees

References

 
Album awards
Contemporary Folk Album